Westville Senior Secondary is a public high school in Port Elizabeth, South Africa, catering for both English and Afrikaans speaking students from grade 8 - 12.

Subjects offered

Grades 8–9 
All Subjects are compulsory for Grade 8–9.

 English home Language
 Afrikaans  ( Additional Language)
 Mathematics
 Social Sciences(SS)  - which includes History & Geography
 Natural Sciences( NS) which includes Science and Biology and life sciences
 Economic and Management Science( EMS)  - Accounting  & Business Economics
 Life Orientation
 (LO)
 Arts and Culture  (A&C)
 Technology ( a wide variety of information and methods of how things work)

Grades 10–12 
A pupil must do 7 subjects 4 compulsory subjects from Group A (including two languages) and three from Group B

Group A 
(All compulsory)

 English (Home Language)
 Afrikaans or Xhosa (Additional language)
 Life Orientation
 Maths or Maths Literacy

Group B 
(Must do 3 of these )

History, Geography, Life sciences (Biology), Physical Science, Accounting, Business Studies, Tourism, Computer Applications Technology (CAT-Computyping )

References

External links 
School profile
subjects offered

Schools in the Eastern Cape
Port Elizabeth